Conceição do Mato Dentro is a Brazilian municipality located in the state of Minas Gerais. The city belongs to the mesoregion Metropolitana de Belo Horizonte and to the microregion of Conceição do Mato Dentro.

Districts 

Brejaúba, Conceição do Mato Dentro, Córregos, Costa Sena, Itacolomi, Ouro Fino do Mato Dentro, Santo Antônio do Cruzeiro, Santo Antônio do Norte, São Sebastião do Bonsucesso, Senhora do Socorro, Tabuleiro do Mato Dentro.

See also
 List of municipalities in Minas Gerais
 Site from Conceição do Mato Dentro

References

Municipalities in Minas Gerais